Trupanea cosmia is a species of tephritid or fruit flies in the genus Trupanea of the family Tephritidae.

Distribution
Madeira, India.

References

Tephritinae
Insects described in 1868
Diptera of Asia
Diptera of Europe